The 31st Annual Grammy Awards were held on February 22, 1989, at Shrine Auditorium, Los Angeles. They recognized accomplishments by musicians from the previous year.

Album of the Year went to George Michael for Faith, and Song of the Year went to Bobby McFerrin for "Don't Worry, Be Happy".

Performers

Award winners
Record of the Year
Linda Goldstein (producer) &  Bobby McFerrin for "Don't Worry, Be Happy"

Album of the Year
George Michael (producer & artist) for Faith

Song of the Year
Bobby McFerrin for "Don't Worry, Be Happy"

Best New Artist
Tracy Chapman

Blues
Best Traditional Blues Recording
Willie Dixon for Hidden Charms
Best Contemporary Blues Recording
The Robert Cray Band for Don't Be Afraid of the Dark

Children's
Best Recording for Children
Ry Cooder (producer & composer), Mark Sottnick (producer) & Robin Williams for Pecos Bill

Classical
Best Orchestral Recording
Robert Woods (producer), Louis Lane, Robert Shaw (conductors) & the Atlanta Symphony Orchestra for Rorem: String Symphony; Sunday Morning; Eagles
Best Classical Vocal Soloist Performance
Emerson Buckley (conductor), Luciano Pavarotti & the Symphony Orchestra of Amelia Romangna for Luciano Pavarotti in Concert
Best Opera Recording
Christopher Raeburn (producer), Georg Solti (conductor), Plácido Domingo, Dietrich Fischer-Dieskau, Siegmund Nimsgern, Jessye Norman, Eva Randová, Hans Sotin, & the Vienna State Opera Orchestra for Wagner: Lohengrin 
Best Choral Performance (other than opera)
Robert Shaw (conductor) & the Atlanta Symphony Orchestra & Chorus for Verdi: Requiem & Operatic Choruses 
Best Classical Performance - Instrumental Soloist(s) (with orchestra)
Carlo Maria Giulini (conductor), Vladimir Horowitz & the La Scala Opera Orchestra for Mozart: Piano Concerto No. 23       
Best Classical Performance - Instrumental Soloist (without orchestra)
Alicia de Larrocha for Albéniz: Iberia, Navarra, Suite Espagnola  
Best Chamber Music Performance
David Corkhill, Evelyn Glennie, Murray Perahia & Georg Solti for Bartók: Sonata for Two Pianos & Percussion  
Best Contemporary Composition
John Adams (composer), Edo de Waart (conductor) & the Orchestra of St. Luke's for Adams: Nixon in China 
Best Classical Album
Robert Woods (producer), Robert Shaw (conductor) & the Atlanta Symphony Orchestra & Chorus for Verdi: Requiem & Operatic Choruses

Comedy
Best Comedy Recording
 Robin Williams for Good Morning Vietnam

Composing and arranging
Best Instrumental Composition
Danny Elfman (composer) for  "The Batman Theme"
Best Song Written Specifically for a Motion Picture or Television
Phil Collins and Lamont Dozier (songwriters) for "Two Hearts" performed by Phil Collins
Best Album of Original Instrumental Background Score Written for a Motion Picture or Television
David Byrne, Cong Su, and Ryuichi Sakamoto (composers) for The Last Emperor 
Best Arrangement on an Instrumental 
Roger Kellaway (arranger) for "Memos From Paradise" performed by Eddie Daniels      
Best Instrumental Arrangement Accompanying Vocal(s)
Jonathan Tunick (arranger) for "No One Is Alone" performed by Cleo Laine

Country
Best Country Vocal Performance, Female
K.T. Oslin for "Hold Me"
Best Country Vocal Performance, Male
Randy Travis for Old 8x10Best Country Performance by a Duo or Group with Vocal
The Judds for "Give a Little Love"
Best Country Vocal Collaboration
 k.d. lang & Roy Orbison for "Crying"
Best Country Instrumental Performance (orchestra, group or soloist)
Asleep at the Wheel for "Sugarfoot Rag"
Best Country Song
K.T. Oslin (songwriter) for "Hold Me"
Best Bluegrass Recording (vocal or instrumental)
Bill Monroe for Southern FlavorFolk
Best Traditional Folk Recording
Don DeVito, Harold Leventhal, Joe McEwen & Ralph Rinzler (producers) for Folkways - A Vision Shared: A Tribute to Woody Guthrie & Leadbelly performed by various artists
Best Contemporary Folk Recording
 Tracy Chapman for Tracy ChapmanGospel
Best Gospel Performance, Female 
Amy Grant for Lead Me OnBest Gospel Performance, Male 
Larnelle Harris for ChristmasBest Gospel Performance by a Duo or Group, Choir or Chorus
The Winans for The Winans Live at Carnegie HallBest Soul Gospel Performance, Female
Aretha Franklin for One Lord, One Faith, One BaptismBest Soul Gospel Performance, Male
BeBe Winans for "Abundant Life"
Best Soul Gospel Performance by a Duo or Group, Choir or Chorus
Take 6  for Take 6Historical
Best Historical Album
Bill Levenson (producer) for Crossroads performed by Eric Clapton

Jazz
Best Jazz Vocal Performance, Female
 Betty Carter for Look What I Got!Best Jazz Vocal Performance, Male
 Bobby McFerrin for BrothersBest Jazz Vocal Performance, Duo or Group
 Take 6 for "Spread Love"
Best Jazz Instrumental Performance Soloist (On a Jazz Recording)
 Michael Brecker for Don't Try This at HomeBest Jazz Instrumental Performance, Group
 Roy Haynes, Cecil McBee, David Murray, Pharoah Sanders & McCoy Tyner for Blues for Coltrane: A Tribute to John ColtraneBest Jazz Instrumental Performance, Big Band
 Gil Evans for Bud and Bird performed by Gil Evans & the Monday Night Orchestra
Best Jazz Fusion Performance
 Yellowjackets for PoliticsLatin
Best Latin Pop Performance
Roberto Carlos for Roberto CarlosBest Tropical Latin Performance
Rubén Blades for AntecedenteBest Mexican-American Performance
Linda Ronstadt for Canciones de Mi PadreMusical show
Best Musical Cast Show Album
Stephen Sondheim (composer & lyricist), Jay David Saks (producer), & various artists for Into the WoodsMusic video
Best Concept Music Video
 "Weird Al" Yankovic, Jay Levey (director), Susan Zwerman (producer) for Fat
Best Performance Music Video
 U2, Meiert Avis (director), Ben Dossett, Michael Hamlyn (producers) for Where The Streets Have No Name

New Age
Best New Age Performance
Shadowfax for Folksongs for a Nuclear Village (Band members: Charles Bisharat, Chuck Greenberg, David Lewis, Phil Maggini, Stuart Nevitt, G. E. Stinson).

Packaging and notes
Best Album Package
 Bill Johnson (art director) for Tired of Runnin'  performed by The O'Kanes
Best Album Notes
 Anthony DeCurtis (notes writer) for Crossroads performed by Eric Clapton

Polka
Best Polka Recording
Jimmy Sturr for Born to PolkaPop
Best Pop Vocal Performance, Female
Tracy Chapman for "Fast Car"
Best Pop Vocal Performance, Male
Bobby McFerrin for "Don't Worry, Be Happy"      
Best Pop Performance by a Duo or Group with Vocal
The Manhattan Transfer for BrasilBest Pop Instrumental Performance (Orchestra, Group Or Soloist)
David Sanborn for Close UpProduction and engineering
Best Engineered Recording, Non-Classical
Tom Lord-Alge (engineer) for Roll With It performed by Steve Winwood  
Best Engineered Recording, Classical
Jack Renner (engineer), Robert Shaw (conductor) & the Atlanta Symphony Orchestra for Verdi: Requiem & Operatic Choruses Producer of the Year, (Non-Classical)
 Neil Dorfsman
Classical Producer of the Year
Robert Woods

R&B
Best R&B Vocal Performance, Female
Anita Baker for "Giving You the Best That I Got"
Best R&B Vocal Performance, Male
Terence Trent D'Arby for Introducing the Hardline According to Terence Trent D'ArbyBest R&B Performance by a Duo or Group with Vocal
Gladys Knight & the Pips for "Love Overboard"
Best R&B Instrumental Performance (Orchestra, Group or Soloist)
Chick Corea for "Light Years" 
Best Rhythm & Blues Song
Anita Baker, Randy Holland & Skip Scarborough  (songwriters) for "Giving You the Best That I Got" performed by Anita Baker

Rap
Best Rap Performance
 "Parents Just Don't Understand" – DJ Jazzy Jeff & The Fresh Prince
 "Supersonic" – J. J. Fad
 "Wild Wild West"  – Kool Moe Dee
 "Going Back to Cali" – LL Cool J
 "Push It" – Salt-n-Pepa

Reggae
Best Reggae Recording
Ziggy Marley & the Melody Makers for Conscious PartyRock
Best Rock Vocal Performance, Female
Tina Turner for Tina Live in EuropeBest Rock Vocal Performance, Male
Robert Palmer for "Simply Irresistible"
Best Rock Performance by a Duo or Group with Vocal
U2 for "Desire"
Best Rock Instrumental Performance (Orchestra, Group or Soloist)
Carlos Santana for Blues for SalvadorBest Hard Rock/Metal Performance Vocal or Instrumental
Jethro Tull for Crest of a KnaveSpoken
Best Spoken Word or Non-musical Recording 
Jesse Jackson for Speech by Rev. Jesse Jackson ''

Trivia
 The Rap Field was added to the Grammy Awards in 1989.
 The Best Metal/Hard Rock award was also added this year, and Jethro Tull infamously won the award over the heavily favored Metallica.

References

 031
1989 in California
1989 music awards
1989 in Los Angeles
1989 in American music
Grammy
February 1989 events in the United States